Alma Lazarevska is a Bosnian writer. A native Sarajevan, she studied philosophy at Sarajevo University. Her books have been translated into English, French and German.

Works
 Sarajevo Solitaire, essays, Sarajevo, 1994.
 The Sign of Rose, novel, Sarajevo, 1996.
 Death at the Museum of Modern Art, short stories, Sarajevo, 1996.
 Plants are something else, short stories, Sarajevo, 2002.

References

Bosnia and Herzegovina women writers
Year of birth missing (living people)
Living people
Bosnia and Herzegovina people of Macedonian descent
Bosnia and Herzegovina novelists